Journey to the West: Conquering the Demons is a 2013 fantasy comedy film co-written and produced by Stephen Chow and co-directed by Chow and Derek Kwok. The movie was first announced in July 2011 and was released on February 10, 2013 in China.  The film is a loose comedic re-interpretation of the 16th-century novel Journey to the West, a Chinese literary classic often believed to be written by Wu Cheng'en.

A sequel, Journey to the West: The Demons Strike Back, written and produced by Chow and directed by Tsui Hark, was released on January 28, 2017.

Plot
The story takes place before Tang Sanzang got his disciples and embarked on the Journey to the West.

A riverside village is terrorized by a mysterious aquatic creature. A Taoist priest kills a giant manta ray and insists that it is the demon. Sanzang, a self-proclaimed demon hunter, appears to warn the villagers that the animal is not the true demon. The villagers ignore him and string him up due to the priest's provocation. The real demon reemerges and kills many of the villagers. Sanzang frees himself and along with the survivors, manages to beach the creature which turns into a man. Sanzang then opens a book of nursery rhymes and begins singing to the demon. Annoyed, the demon attacks Sanzang. Another demon hunter, Duan, captures and turns the demon into a puppet. Sanzang tells Duan that his master taught him a more humane approach; to use nursery rhymes to coax goodness out of demons, a tactic Duan scoffs at. Disillusioned, Sanzang meets his master and bemoans his lack of capabilities compared to more aggressive demon-hunters. His master reaffirms his humanist philosophy and sends Sanzang off again to find "enlightenment".

A couple enters an empty restaurant but the chef reveals himself to be a pig demon and kills them. Sanzang comes to the same restaurant, this time apparently filled with people. Sanzang sees through the illusion and recognizes them as reanimated corpses of the victims, as well as the demon's nine-toothed rake. Duan bursts into the restaurant, destroys all the zombies, and attacks the pig demon. She captures the demon in her magic bag to turn it into a puppet, but it bursts out of the bag and transforms into a huge boar, collapsing the building. Sanzang and Duan retreat. Duan then develops a strong limerence towards Sanzang after being impressed by his selfless ideals. She expresses her feelings, but Sanzang flees, not wishing to deal with romantic love in his quest for nirvana.

Sanzang's master advises him to tame the Monkey King demon Sun Wukong (trapped by Buddha) to subdue the pig demon. That night, he is captured by a gang that had also subdued Duan. It is later revealed to be a plot orchestrated by Duan to trick Sanzang into having sex with her. After Sanzang rejects her again, she has him imprisoned. The pig demon reappears and injures Duan, but is chased off by a trio of rivaling demon-hunters. Duan views Sanzang's concern for her injuries as a romantic attraction. After Sanzang refuses her advances again, she destroys his book of nursery rhymes and he leaves.

After days of traveling, Sanzang discovers a cave under a lotus garden, where Monkey King was trapped in for 500 years. Monkey King tells Sanzang to use a dancer to bait the demon. Duan appears and volunteers to dance. When the pig demon appears Monkey King easily subdues it, allowing Duan to turn it into a puppet. Duan then gives both the fish and pig puppets to Sanzang and offers her golden ringed weapon as an engagement band, but he rejects her again. She leaves after returning his nursery rhyme book, which she had pieced back together, although at random as she is illiterate.

Monkey King tricks Sanzang into removing the seal on his prison and bursts out of the cave. Sanzang begins to pray to Buddha, and an enraged Monkey King rips the hair from his head. The three demon hunters appear to catch Monkey King but he effortlessly kills them. Duan returns and defends Sanzang, but the Monkey King mortally injures her. Sanzang admits he loves her, and Monkey King proceeds to vaporize her body. Looking at the nursery book again, Sanzang realizes Duan accidentally reassembled the words of his book into those of the Buddha Sutra. Sanzang summons Buddha, who defeats Monkey King with the palm of his hand. Sanzang then places Duan's golden ring on Monkey King, and it turns into his restrictive headband.

Sanzang tells his master that his suffering due to Duan's loss has helped him to enlightenment. Sanzang is then instructed to travel on a journey to the west (India) for the Buddhist sutras of Leiyin Temple, and it is shown that the Water Demon, Pig Demon, and Monkey King have been tamed and turned into humans named, respectively, Sha Wujing, Zhu Bajie and Sun Wukong. As they hike across the desert, Sanzang looks across the sand and sees an image of Duan.

Key ghosts and demons in Journey to the West 
Because of dialects and translations, there are various ways of spelling the demons names that are described below.

Sha Wujing 

The Demon Sha Wujing is the first demon that we are introduced to in the film. Sha Wujing takes the form of a giant fish that begins by eating the villagers as they celebrate the killing of a giant manta ray, who they all believe, against Sanzang's pleading, is the demon. Also known as the 'Water Demon' in the literature, Sha Wujing's role in the film is to introduce us to Duan and Sanzang and their styles of demon hunting.

Zhu Bajie (Zhu Wuneng) 
The Demon Zhu Bajie is the second formidable demon that is encountered in the film. In the film, his human form is that of a mute and playful inn keeper with a waxy visage. His demon form is that of a ferocious pig. Although he tries to trick Duan and Sanzang into becoming victims, Sanzang is able to see through Zhu Bajie's illusions and works with Duan in an attempt to defeat him.

Sun Wukong 
The final and most formidable demon that is encountered in the film is that of Sun Wukong, the Monkey King. Locked by Buddha in solitude in a hidden cave, the Monkey King first appear as a disheveled and awkward older man with monkey-like characteristics to his movements. Through many attempts at tricking Sanzang to release him, he finally succeeds, and we see The Monkey King restore himself to his greatest power and become the Demon Hunters' greatest threat.

The Monkey King as a character in the film adaptation of the classic Chinese literature, has further spawned many different sub-stories, including comics, graphic novels, musicals, and theater performances, amongst other works of entertainment.

Cast

Shu Qi as Duan
Wen Zhang as Tang Sanzang
Huang Bo as Sun Wukong
Chen Bing Qiang as Zhu Bajie
Lee Sheung Ching as Sha Wujing
Show Lo as Prince Important
Cheng Sihan as Master Nameless
Xing Yu as Fist of the North Star
Lu Zheng Yu as Killer One
Chiu Chi Ling as Killer Two
Yang Di as Killer Three
Chrissie Chau as Killer Four
Ge Hang Yu as Killer Five and Short Sun Wukong
Fung Min-hun as Taoist Priest
Yeung Lun as Mayor
Zhang Chao Li as Almighty Foot
He Wun Hui as Maple
Tang Yixin as Blossom
Chen Yichun and Liu Zhan Ling as Gao Family Inn Managers
Huang Xiao Chuan as Leader of the Sand People
Zhang Yu Wen as Sheng
Xu Min as Mrs. Gen
Li Jing as Gen
Zhang Wei Fu as Grandpa Gen
Fan Fu Lin as Muscleman
Dai Qu Hua as Lan
Zhong Kai Jie as Lan's baby
Xie Jing Jing as Fat Lady
Yu Qian Wen as Fat Lady's husband
Kong Wu Shuang as Singing Girl
Li Gao Ji as Taoist Priest Fook
Wen Fei Fei as Monk Lu
Huang Hai Seng as Monk Shou
Zhang Wan Ku, Xu Wen Qiang, Chen Jian Feng, Li Nin Cai, Li Jing, Li Gui Suan, Han Xiao Chuang, Yu Ping, Li Yong Bo, Gong Meng Ying, Ge Hui Lei, Zhang Hong Di, Chen Xing Xiang, Zhang Cheng Long, and Wang Ya Bing as villagers
 Min Hun Fung

Demons in Chinese folklore

Religious connections in Journey to the West 
The initial novel was interpreted as a religious text. Early examination of the novel displayed a cross-culture of religions, from the main Buddhist references to the addition of Confucianism and Taoism. The differences throughout the film with regards to the various Eastern religions have religious scholars having different outlooks on to the specifics of the religion displayed in the film. The mix of Taoist ideas of internal alchemy and the references to Buddhism create the greatest discord amongst the religious scholars.

Box office
The film set several records at the Chinese box-office.  The film was released on February 10, 2013 in China and opened to 78 million Yuan ($12.5 million) on its first day, thus overtaking the 70 million yuan ($11.2 million) opening-day record set by Painted Skin: The Resurrection on June 28, 2012 as the biggest opening-day gross for a Chinese film.  On February 14, 2013, the film grossed 122 million yuan ($19.6 million) and thus overtook the record of 112 million yuan by Transformers: Dark of the Moon as the biggest single-day gross by a film in China's box-office history. The film set an opening record in China with $92.46 million.

To date, the film has grossed US$205 million in China, US$3.6 million in Hong Kong, US$3.2 million in Malaysia, and US$1.8 million in Singapore.

Journey to the West: Conquering the Demons grossed a total of US$215 million worldwide, making it highest grossing Chinese-language film ever. It was surpassed by Monster Hunt, in 2015, as the highest Chinese film ever produced.

Critical reception
The film was well received by critics. Rotten Tomatoes reported that 94% of critics have given the film a positive review based on 34 reviews, with an average rating of 7.22/10. The site's critics consensus reads, "As sweet, silly, action-packed and ridiculous as director Steven Chow's best work, Journey to the West serves up dazzling action sequences while playing its disparate elements against each other with thrilling abandon." According to Metacritic, the film has received an weighted average score of 68 based on 13 reviews, indicating "generally favorable reviews".

Edmund Lee of Screen International describes the film as "a thoroughly entertaining action comedy." Andrew Chan gave the film 9/10 and writes, "Stephen Chow latest revisit to "Journey to the West: Conquering the Demons" is a highly entertaining affair. From the get go, the audience is treated with Chow famed exaggerated style of comedy." However, the film provides its audience with something beyond entertainment. As American author Grady Hendrix says, "Now a director, Chow ups the stakes and makes what might be his most emotionally compelling movie yet".

Sequel

Derek Kwok reported in March 2013 that there were ongoing discussions about a script for a sequel with Stephen Chow, who may appear in it himself. The film has a reported budget of around US$64 million. Filming started on 6 August 2015, starring Kris Wu as Tang Sanzang, Lin Gengxin as Sun Wukong, Mengke Bateer as Sha Wujing, Yao Chen as Taoist, and Bao Bei'er as an unannounced character, Shu Qi and Cheng Sihan reprise their roles as Duan and Master Nameless respectively.

References

External links
 
 
 

Chinese fantasy comedy films
Films directed by Derek Kwok
Films directed by Stephen Chow
Hong Kong action comedy films
Hong Kong fantasy comedy films
IMAX films
Films based on Journey to the West
Demons in film
2010s fantasy comedy films
2013 comedy films
2013 films
Village Roadshow Pictures films
2010s Mandarin-language films
2010s Hong Kong films